Syrrhaptes is a genus of birds in the sandgrouse family. The genus name is from Ancient Greek
surrhaptos, "sewn together"; the feathered toes of birds in this genus are fused together.

There are two central Asian species.

These are large birds breeding in open steppes or plateau. They nest in a ground scrape into which three eggs are laid.

Both species have mainly buff upperparts, an orange face and feathered legs and toes. They are smaller-headed than other sandgrouse, but have sturdy compact bodies.

The small feet lack a hind toe, and the three front toes are fused together. The upper surface is feathered, and the underneath has a fleshy pad. The appearance of the foot is more like a paw than an avian foot.

Although there is range overlap, they are easily distinguished. Tibetan sandgrouse has a white belly and black underwings, whereas Pallas's has a black belly and white underwings.

These birds are gregarious like other sandgrouse.  Flocks fly to watering holes at dawn and dusk, on long pointed wings.

References

 
Bird genera